Andrew Samuels (born 19 January 1949) is a British psychotherapist and writer on political and social themes from a psychological viewpoint. He has worked with politicians, political organisations, activist groups and members of the public in Europe, US, Brazil, Israel, Japan, Russia and South Africa as a political and organisational consultant. Clinically, Samuels has developed a blend of Jungian and post-Jungian, relational psychoanalytic and humanistic approaches.

Career

Andrew Samuels began his career running a commune-style radical theatre company in the late 1960s and early 1970s, directing plays in and around Oxford. At the age of 22 he declined an offer to become the assistant director at the Royal Shakespeare Company and instead went on to develop a drama and youth counselling project in South Wales, working with deprived children. He then gained a Diploma in Social Administration at the London School of Economics, subsequently qualified as a psychiatric social worker and went on to train at the Society of Analytical Psychology (founded in 1946 in London to develop the ideas of Carl Jung)  where he is a training analyst.

He co-founded Psychotherapists and Counsellors for Social Responsibility which was formed in 1995 as an independent organisation that emerged from the United Kingdom Council for Psychotherapy. It was founded by a group of therapists and analysts from disparate theoretical backgrounds (psychoanalytical, Jungian and Humanistic) who wished to use the insights gained in the consulting room and elsewhere by taking them into the outside world to influence political and public discourse. Considering the sometimes enormous interdisciplinary divides, it sought to bridge these divisions. The organisation deliberately included psychoanalysts, psychotherapists and counsellors under one roof, something never previously attempted.

He co-founded "Antidote": a psychotherapy-based think tank which, supported by a number of New Labour luminaries, launched its manifesto for an "Emotionally Literate Society" at the Houses of Parliament. He is also a founding member of the International Association for Jungian Studies, a learned society formed in 2002 for Jungian scholars and clinicians.

Samuels and Renos Papadopoulos were among the first professors of Analytical psychology in the world (the first being David H. Rosen at Texas A&M University in 1986). They are the co-founders of the Masters in Jungian and Post-Jungian Studies at the Centre for Psychoanalytic Studies at the University of Essex, UK. The ethos of the course is to take an informative, critical and reflective stance in relation to the core concepts of Analytical psychology as developed by Carl Jung, post-Jungians of all schools and scholars in academic disciplines. This is balanced with an emphasis on clinical theory as well as on applications of Analytical psychology in areas such as cultural and gender studies, social and political theory, philosophy and religion.

In 2006, he was elected one of the first group of six honorary fellows of the United Kingdom Council for Psychotherapy (UKCP). In 2009, he was elected chair of the UKCP. He is Emeritus Professor of Analytical Psychology at Essex, Visiting Professor of Psychoanalytic Studies at Goldsmiths, University of London, Honorary Professor of Psychology and Therapeutic Studies at Roehampton University and Visiting Adjunct Professor at the New York University Postdoctoral Program in Psychotherapy and Psychoanalysis.

Books

Samuels' books include Jung and the Post-Jungians (1985), The Father (1986), A Critical Dictionary of Jungian Analysis (1986, with Bani Shorter and Alfred Plaut), The Plural Psyche (1989), Psychopathology: Contemporary Jungian Perspectives (1992), The Political Psyche (1993) and Politics on the Couch: Citizenship and the Internal Life (2001). This last book won the Gradiiva Prize 2001 awarded by the National Association for the Advancement of Psychoanalysis. Andrew Samuels' books have been translated into 19 languages.

Select bibliography

Books

Samuels, A., (1985). Jung and the PostJungians. London: Routledge and Kegan Paul. 
Samuels, A., (ed.)(1985). The Father: Contemporary Jungian Perspectives. London: Free Association Books. 
Samuels, A., Shorter, Bani. and Plaut, Fred. (1986). A Critical Dictionary of Jungian Analysis. London: Routledge and Kegan Paul. 
Samuels, A., (1989). The Plural Psyche: Personality, Morality & The Father. London: Routledge. 
Samuels, A., (ed.) (1992). Psychopathology: Contemporary Jungian Perspectives. New York: Guildford Press. 
Samuels, A., (1993). The Political Psyche. London: Routledge. 
Samuels, A., (2001). Politics on the Couch : Citizenship and the Internal Life. London : Profile.

Book chapters
Samuels, A., (1996). 'The Future of Jungian Studies: A Personal Agenda.' In M. Stanton & D. Reason (eds) Teaching Transference: On the Foundation of Psychoanalytic Studies, London: Rebus Press. 
Samuels, A., (1998). 'Will the post-Jungians Survive?' In Casement, A. (ed.) Post-Jungians Today, Key papers in Contemporary Analytical Psychology New York: Routledge. .
Samuels, A. (2006). 'Transference/Countertransference.' In R. Papadopoulos (ed.) Handbook of Jungian Psychology. New York: Routledge.

Journal articles
 

 

Samuels, A., (1991). 'Pluralism and Training', Journal of the British Association of Psychotherapists, 22.

Newspaper articles
"Comment & Analysis: Solutions for our lost children.(Guardian Leader Pages)." The Guardian (London, England) (14 September 2004): 25. Gale Custom Database – Newspapers. Thomson Gale. TORONTO PUBLIC LIBRARIES (CELPLO). 18 October 2006

References

External links
Official website
Samuels on BBC Radio 4 with Melvyn Bragg on "In Our Time: Jung"

1949 births
Living people
British social workers
Jungian psychologists
British psychologists
Academics of the University of Essex
Alumni of the London School of Economics
British tax resisters